Epiphyllum oxypetalum, the Dutchman's pipe cactus, princess of the night or queen of the night, is a species of cactus. It blooms nocturnally, and its flowers wilt before dawn. Though it is sometimes referred to as a night-blooming cereus, it is not closely related to any of the species in the tribe Cereeae, such as Selenicereus, that are more commonly known as night-blooming cereus. All Cereus species bloom at night and are terrestrial plants; Epiphyllum species are usually epiphytic.

Description
The stems are erect, ascending, scandent, or sprawling and profusely branched. The stem margins are shallowly through deeply crenate and undulate. Stems appear to be waxy therefore cutin may be present. Cutin reduces water loss from stems. A gel-like substance oozes out of stem cuts. Stems contain much water-filled tissue.

Flowers
The flowers are nocturnal. The principal odor components in the aroma are benzyl salicylate and methyl linoleate. Pericarpels are nude, slightly angled, and green. Bracteoles are short and narrow up through ca.  long. Receptacles are up through 20 cm long, 1 cm thick, brownish, and arching. The outer tepals are linear, acute, 8–10 cm long, and reddish through amber. The stamens are greenish white or white, slender and weak. The styles are greenish white, pale yellow, or white, 4 mm thick, as long as inner tepals, and with many lobes.

The fruits are oblong, up through 12 x 8 cm, purplish red, and angled.

Systematics
This species is closely related to E. thomasianum and E. pumilum, but quite distinct from them. In 1909, C. A. Purpus collected a slightly different type in St. Ana, Orizaba, Mexico. It has carmine red outer petals and the flowers have an unpleasant smell, rather than being fragrant. It was originally named Phyllocactus purpusii, but is now included within this species.

Name 
Epiphyllum from Greek epi- "upon" + phullon "leaf"

Oxypetalum = with acute petals

Range
Epiphyllum oxypetalum is native to Southern Mexico and to extensive areas of South America. It is widely cultivated, with many escapes from cultivation in tropical areas, especially in southeast Asia. It has become naturalised in China.

Cultivation and uses
Epiphyllum oxypetalum is an easily cultivated, fast growing Epiphyllum. It flowers in late spring through late summer; large specimens can produce several crops of flowers in one season. This is a widely cultivated Epiphyllum species. 

It is known to have medicinal properties in many Asian cultures, including India, Vietnam, and Malaysia. The plant is widely used in traditional medicine to treat respiratory ailments, bleeding conditions, and is also believed to have the property of reducing pain and inflammation.

References

External links

 Epiphyllum oxypetallum (Brahmakamal) : Orchid Cactus- An interesting plant

Night-blooming plants
oxypetalum
Cacti of Mexico
Epiphytes